The Fahrenheit scale is a temperature scale based on one proposed in 1724 by the physicist Daniel Gabriel Fahrenheit (1686–1736). It uses the degree Fahrenheit (symbol: °F) as the unit. Several accounts of how he originally defined his scale exist, but the original paper suggests the lower defining point, 0 °F, was established as the freezing temperature of a solution of brine made from a mixture of water, ice, and ammonium chloride (a salt). The other limit established was his best estimate of the average human body temperature, originally set at 90 °F, then 96 °F (about 2.6 °F less than the modern value due to a later redefinition of the scale).

For much of the 20th century, the Fahrenheit scale was defined by two fixed points with a 180 °F separation: the temperature at which pure water freezes was defined as 32 °F and the boiling point of water was defined to be 212 °F, both at sea level and under standard atmospheric pressure. It is now formally defined using the Kelvin scale and hence ultimately by the Boltzmann constant, the Planck constant, and the second (defined as a specific number of cycles of the unperturbed ground-state hyperfine transition frequency of the caesium-133 atom.)

It continues to be officially used in the United States (including its unincorporated territories), its freely associated states in the Western Pacific (Palau, the Federated States of Micronesia and the Marshall Islands), the Cayman Islands, and the former American colony of Liberia. Fahrenheit is used alongside the Celsius scale in Antigua and Barbuda and other countries which use the same meteorological service, such as Saint Kitts and Nevis, the Bahamas, and Belize. A handful of British Overseas Territories, including the Virgin Islands, Montserrat, Anguilla, and Bermuda, still use both scales. All other countries now use Celsius ("centigrade" until 1948), a scale formalized about 20 years after the Fahrenheit scale. The United Kingdom started to change from Fahrenheit to Celsius in 1962, and many people remain aware of Fahrenheit temperatures; degrees Fahrenheit are sometimes used in newspaper headlines to sensationalize heatwaves.

Definition and conversion 

Historically, on the Fahrenheit scale the freezing point of water was 32 °F, and the boiling point was 212 °F (at standard atmospheric pressure). This put the boiling and freezing points of water 180 degrees apart. On the Celsius scale, the freezing and boiling points of water were originally defined to be 100 degrees apart. A temperature interval of 1 °F was equal to an interval of  degrees Celsius. With the Fahrenheit and Celsius scales now both defined by the kelvin, this relationship was preserved, a temperature interval of 1 °F being equal to an interval of  K and of  °C. The Fahrenheit and Celsius scales intersect numerically at −40 in the respective unit (i.e, −40 °F ≘ −40 °C).

Absolute zero is 0 K, −273.15 °C, or −459.67 °F. The Rankine temperature scale uses degree intervals of the same size as those of the Fahrenheit scale, except that absolute zero is 0 °R the same way that the Kelvin temperature scale matches the Celsius scale, except that absolute zero is 0 K.

The combination of degree symbol (°) followed by an uppercase letter F is the conventional symbol for the Fahrenheit temperature scale. A number followed by this symbol (and separated from it with a space) denotes a specific temperature point (e.g., "Gallium melts at 85.5763 °F"). A difference between temperatures or an uncertainty in temperature is also conventionally written the same way as well, e.g., "The output of the heat exchanger experiences an increase of 72 °F" or "Our standard uncertainty is ±5 °F". However, some authors instead use the notation "An increase of 50 F°" (reversing the symbol order) to indicate temperature differences. Similar conventions exist for the Celsius scale, see .

Conversion (specific temperature point) 
For an exact conversion between degrees Fahrenheit and Celsius, and kelvins of a specific temperature point, the following formulas can be applied. Here,  is the value in degrees Fahrenheit,  the value in degrees Celsius, and  the value in kelvins:
  °F to  °C:  = 
  °C to  °F:  =  × 1.8 + 32
  °F to  K:  = 
  K to  °F:  =  × 1.8 − 459.67

There is also an exact conversion between Celsius and Fahrenheit scales making use of the correspondence −40 °F ≘ −40 °C. Again,  is the numeric value in degrees Fahrenheit, and  the numeric value in degrees Celsius:
  °F to  °C:  =  − 40
  °C to  °F:  = ( + 40) × 1.8 − 40

Conversion (temperature difference or interval) 
When converting a temperature interval between the Fahrenheit and Celsius scales, only the ratio is used, without any constant (in this case, the interval has the same numeric value in kelvins as in degrees Celsius):
  °F to  °C or  K:  =  = 
  °C or  K to  °F:  =  × 1.8 =  × 1.8

History 
Fahrenheit proposed his temperature scale in 1724, basing it on two reference points of temperature. In his initial scale (which is not the final Fahrenheit scale), the zero point was determined by placing the thermometer in "a mixture of ice, water, and salis Armoniaci [transl. ammonium chloride] or even sea salt". This combination forms a eutectic system, which stabilizes its temperature automatically: 0 °F was defined to be that stable temperature. A second point, 96 degrees, was approximately the human body's temperature. A third point, 32 degrees, was marked as being the temperature of ice and water "without the aforementioned salts".

According to a German story, Fahrenheit actually chose the lowest air temperature measured in his hometown Danzig (Gdańsk, Poland) in winter 1708–09 as 0 °F, and only later had the need to be able to make this value reproducible using brine.

According to a letter Fahrenheit wrote to his friend Herman Boerhaave, his scale was built on the work of Ole Rømer, whom he had met earlier. In Rømer scale, brine freezes at zero, water freezes and melts at 7.5 degrees, body temperature is 22.5, and water boils at 60 degrees. Fahrenheit multiplied each value by 4 in order to eliminate fractions and make the scale more fine-grained. He then re-calibrated his scale using the melting point of ice and normal human body temperature (which were at 30 and 90 degrees); he adjusted the scale so that the melting point of ice would be 32 degrees, and body temperature 96 degrees, so that 64 intervals would separate the two, allowing him to mark degree lines on his instruments by simply bisecting the interval 6 times (since 64 = 26).

Fahrenheit soon after observed that water boils at about 212 degrees using this scale. The use of the freezing and boiling points of water as thermometer fixed reference points became popular following the work of Anders Celsius, and these fixed points were adopted by a committee of the Royal Society led by Henry Cavendish in 1776–77. Under this system, the Fahrenheit scale is redefined slightly so that the freezing point of water was exactly 32 °F, and the boiling point was exactly 212 °F, or 180 degrees higher. It is for this reason that normal human body temperature is approximately 98.6 °F (oral temperature) on the revised scale (whereas it was 90° on Fahrenheit's multiplication of Rømer, and 96° on his original scale).

In the present-day Fahrenheit scale, 0 °F no longer corresponds to the eutectic temperature of ammonium chloride brine as described above. Instead, that eutectic is at approximately 4 °F on the final Fahrenheit scale.

The Rankine temperature scale was based upon the Fahrenheit temperature scale, with its zero representing absolute zero instead.

Usage

General

The Fahrenheit scale was the primary temperature standard for climatic, industrial and medical purposes in English-speaking countries until the 1960s. In the late 1960s and 1970s, the Celsius scale replaced Fahrenheit in almost all of those countries—with the notable exception of the United States and in certain cases, the United Kingdom—typically during their general metrication process.

Fahrenheit is used in the United States, its territories and associated states (all served by the U.S. National Weather Service), as well as the Cayman Islands and Liberia for everyday applications. For example, U.S. weather forecasts, food cooking, and freezing temperatures are typically given in degrees Fahrenheit. Scientists, including meteorologists, use degrees Celsius or kelvin in all countries.

United States
Early in the 20th century, Halsey and Dale suggested that reasons for resistance to use the centigrade (now Celsius) system in the U.S. included the larger size of each degree Celsius and the lower zero point in the Fahrenheit system; put another way, the Fahrenheit scale is more intuitive than Celsius for describing outdoor temperatures in temperate latitudes, with 100 °F being a hot summer day and 0 °F a cold winter day.

Canada
Canada has passed legislation favoring the International System of Units, while also maintaining legal definitions for traditional Canadian imperial units. Canadian weather reports are conveyed using degrees Celsius with occasional reference to Fahrenheit especially for cross-border broadcasts. Fahrenheit is still used on virtually all Canadian ovens. Thermometers, both digital and analog, sold in Canada usually employ both the Celsius and Fahrenheit scales.

European Union

In the European Union, it is mandatory to use kelvins or degrees Celsius when quoting temperature for "economic, public health, public safety and administrative" purposes, though degrees Fahrenheit may be used alongside degrees Celsius as a supplementary unit. For example, the laundry symbols used in the United Kingdom follow the recommendations of ISO 3758:2005 showing the temperature of the washing machine water in degrees Celsius only. The equivalent label in North America uses one to six dots to denote temperature with an optional temperature in degrees Celsius.

United Kingdom
Although Fahrenheit was the most popular scale in the United Kingdom, for many years Celsius has been the primary scale used, and it has been taught in schools since the 1970s. Within unregulated sectors, such as journalism, the use of Fahrenheit in the United Kingdom follows no fixed pattern, with degrees Fahrenheit sometimes appearing alongside degrees Celsius. The Daily Telegraph does not mention Fahrenheit on its daily weather page, while The Times also has an all-metric daily weather page but has a Celsius-to-Fahrenheit conversion table. When publishing news stories, some UK tabloids have adopted a tendency of using degrees Celsius in headlines and discussion relating to low temperatures and Fahrenheit for mid to high temperatures. In February 2006, the writer of an article in The Times suggested that the rationale was one of emphasis: "−6 °C" sounds colder than "21 °F", and "94 °F" sounds more impressive than "34 °C".

Unicode representation of symbol
Unicode provides the Fahrenheit symbol at code point . However, this is a compatibility character encoded for roundtrip compatibility with legacy encodings.

See also

 Comparison of temperature scales
 Degree of frost

Notes

References

External links
 
 
 Daniel Gabriel Fahrenheit (Polish-born Dutch physicist) – Encyclopædia Britannica
 "At Auction | One of Only Three Original Fahrenheit Thermometers" Enfilade page for 2012 Christie's sale of a Fahrenheit mercury thermometer
Christie's press release
 

Customary units of measurement in the United States
Imperial units
Scales of temperature
1724 introductions
Scales in meteorology